The 2019–20 Basketball Bundesliga, known as the easyCredit BBL for sponsorship reasons, was the 54th season of the Basketball Bundesliga (BBL), the top-tier level of professional club basketball in Germany, held from 24 September 2019 to 28 June 2020. The defending champion was Bayern Munich.

Alba Berlin won the final tournament and their ninth title.

Due to the COVID-19 pandemic the league postponed matchday 23 and monitored the situation. On 25 March, the league was suspended until 30 April. The season will be finished with ten teams playing at a neutral venue.

Teams

Team changes

This was the first season in which teams were required to have a minimum budget of €3 million and a minimum equity of €250,000. Seventeen clubs obtained a license for this season.

Hamburg Towers were promoted to the BBL after winning the 2018–19 ProA, while Nürnberg Falcons were promoted as runner-up but were unable to obtain a license. Eisbären Bremerhaven and Science City Jena were relegated.

Arenas and locations

Personnel and sponsorship

Coaching changes

Regular season
In the regular season, teams would have  played against each other two times home-and-away in a round-robin format. The eight first qualified teams would advanced to the playoffs. The last placed team would have been relegated to the ProA for next season.

League table

Results

End of season tournament
Because of the COVID-19 pandemic in Germany, the board of the BBL decided on 27 April to continue the season in a tournament format. The nine highest-placed teams in the regular season and Frankfurt will play behind closed doors. On 19 May, the Bavarian government allowed the tournament to be held at the Audi Dome in Munich. The schedule was announced on 20 May 2020.

All times are local (UTC+2).

Preliminary round

Group A

Group B

Ninth place game

Knockout stage

Quarterfinals

Overview

|}

Matches

Ulm won 197–130 on aggregate.

Ludwigsburg won 160–157 on aggregate.

Berlin won 181–153 on aggregate.

Oldenburg won 175–156 on aggregate.

Semifinals

Overview

|}

Matches

Ludwigsburg won 165–156 on aggregate.

Berlin won 173–122 on aggregate.

Final

Overview

|}

Matches

Berlin won 163–139 on aggregate.

Awards and statistics

Major award winners
Only the Finals MVP was recorded, all other awards were cancelled.

Statistics

The statistics account for the regular season before it was suspended on matchday 23.

See also
2019–20 BBL-Pokal

German clubs in European competitions

References

External links
Official website 

Basketball Bundesliga seasons
German
1
Basketball Bundesliga